Bilahari is a rāgam in Carnatic music (musical scale of South Indian classical music). It is a janya rāgam (derived scale) from the 29th melakarta scale Sankarabharanam. It is a janya scale, as it does not have all the seven swaras (musical notes) in the ascending scale. It is a combination of the pentatonic scale Mohanam and the sampurna raga scale Sankarabharanam.

Structure and Lakshana 

Bilahari is an asymmetric rāgam that does not contain madhyamam or nishādham in the ascending scale. It is an audava-sampurna rāgam (or owdava rāgam, meaning pentatonic ascending scale). Its  structure (ascending and descending scale) is as follows:

 :  they are used in every song

 : 

The notes used in this scale are shadjam, chathusruthi rishabham, antara gandhara, panchamam and chathusruthi dhaivatham in ascending scale, with kakali nishadham and shuddha madhyamam included in descending scale. For the details of the notations and terms, see swaras in Carnatic music.

This rāgam also uses kaishiki nishadham (N2) as an external note (anya swara) in the descending scale. Hence it is considered a bhashanga rāgam, a scale with notes external to the parent scale.

Popular compositions
There are many compositions set to Bilahari rāgam. Here are some popular kritis composed in Bilahari.

Sharanu Janakana By Purandara Dasa
Belagu Javadi Baro By Vadiraja Tirtha
Lakshmi Shobhane By Vadiraja Tirtha. This is one of the greatest literary works of Vadiraja Tirtha with 112 Charanas and the longest composition known by a carnatic composer
Hanumana Maneyavaru by Vidyaprasanna teertha in Kannada
Na jeevadhara, Dorakuna ituvanti and Kanukontini composed by Tyagaraja
Sri Balasubramanya, Kamakshi Sri Varalakshmi by Muthuswami Dikshitar
Smara Sada, Aaradhayami, Gopalam Seveham, Pahi Padmanabha, Jaya Suganalaya, Pahi Sarasanabha, Santhatham Bhajami and Vimukhava Tava by Maharaja Swathi Thirunal Rama Varma
Parithana michite by Patnam Subramania Iyer
Sri Chamundeshwari by Mysore Vasudevacharya
Anaamilo mahaboob is a Khayal in Hindi by Maharaja Swathi Thirunal Rama Varma
 Puraya Mama Kamam  is a Tharangam by Narayana Teertha
 "Raa ra venu gopala" a famous Swarajathi was composed in Bilahari
Rabindranath Tagore has composed 'Ami Marer Sagor Pari Debo' In Raga Bilahari.
" Intha Chouka" is a varnam composed by Veenai Kuppaiyer
Maa Mayura a Tamil Kriti composed by Mazhavai Chidambara Bharathi

Film songs

Language:Tamil

Related rāgams 
This section covers the theoretical and scientific aspect of this rāgam.

Scale similarities 
Mohanam has a symmetric pentatonic scale, with the notes same as the ascending scale of Bilahari. Its  structure is S R2 G3 P D2 S : S D2 P G3 R2 S
Mohanakalyani is a rāgam which has the prati madhyamam in descending scale (descending scale of Kalyani) in place of the shuddha madhyamam. Its  structure is S R2 G3 P D2 S : S N3 D2 P M2 G3 R2 S
Garudadhvani is a rāgam which has the ascending and descending scales interchanged, in comparison with Bilahari. Its  structure is S R2 G3 M1 P D2 N3 S : S D2 P G3 R2 S
Desakshi is a raga which is similar to Bilahari. The arohana remains the same, while the sampoorna avarohana has Kaishiki Nishada in place of Kakali Nishada.

Notes

References

Janya ragas